Allophylus roigii is a species of plant in the family Sapindaceae. It is endemic to Cuba.

References

Endemic flora of Cuba
roigii
Vulnerable plants
Taxonomy articles created by Polbot